Sherman Township is a township located in Hardin County, Iowa. As of the 2010 Census, its population was 738.

History
Sherman Township was founded in 1870. It is named for William Tecumseh Sherman.

References

Townships in Hardin County, Iowa
Townships in Iowa
1870 establishments in Iowa